The 2018–19 Australian Baseball League season was the ninth year Australian Baseball League (ABL) season, and was held from 15 November 2018 to 2 February 2019. It was the first season that it was played with eight teams, as the league expanded for the first time. The Brisbane Bandits won the championship for the fourth consecutive season.

Teams

Regular season 
With the addition of the Auckland Tuatara and Geelong-Korea as expansion teams, the competition was split into a 'Northeast' and 'Southwest' division. The league retained a 10-round, 40 game schedule, with teams playing division rivals eight times and inter division teams four times.

Statistical leaders

Postseason
A new playoff structure was announced 29 August 2018 with the addition of a single wild card game between the fourth and fifth seeds prior to two rounds of best-of-three finals series.

The top seed awarded to the team with the best regular season record, with the other division winner awarded the second seed. The third and fourth seed were awarded to the two divisional runner ups with the fifth seed being given to the team with the next best season record.

Championship Series

References

External links 
The Australian Baseball League – Official ABL Website
Official Baseball Australia Website

Australian Baseball League seasons
Australian Baseball League
Australian Baseball League